Salma Chowdhury (born 1 November 1971) is a Bangladeshi politician who is elected as Member of 11th Jatiya Sangsad of Reserved Seats for Women on 4 August 2019. She is a Bangladesh Awami League politician. Her father Md. Abdul Wajed Chowdhury was a Jatiya Sangsad member representing the Rajbari-1 constituency.

References

1971 births
Living people
Awami League politicians
People from Rajbari District
11th Jatiya Sangsad members
Bangladeshi women in politics
21st-century Bangladeshi women politicians